Inaxio Kortabarria Abarrategi (born 31 July 1950) is a Spanish former footballer who played as a central defender.

Club career
Kortabarria was born in Mondragón, Gipuzkoa. During his career he played solely for Real Sociedad, making his first-team – and La Liga – debut on 19 September 1971 against Deportivo de La Coruña and finishing his first season with 14 appearances.

From there onwards, Kortabarria rarely missed a game, contributing 30 and 31 matches respectively as the Basques won back-to-back leagues (whilst adding five and six goals, his career-bests) with him as captain. In the last round of the 1980–81 campaign, he opened the scoring through an early penalty as Real drew 2–2 at Sporting de Gijón to eventually edge Real Madrid on goal difference.

After losing his place to younger Agustín Gajate, Alberto Górriz and Juan Antonio Larrañaga, all brought up in the club's youth academy, Kortabarria chose to retire at the end of 1984–85 aged 35. He made 442 appearances in all competitions, eighth all-time for Real Sociedad.

International career
Kortabarria earned four caps for Spain, in less than one year. His debut came on 22 May 1976, in a 2–0 loss in West Germany for the UEFA Euro 1976's qualifying stages.

Political views
On 5 December 1976, before a game against Athletic Bilbao, Kortabarria and the opposing captain, José Ángel Iribar, carried out the Ikurriña, the Basque flag, and placed it ceremonially on the centre-circle. This was the first public display of the flag since the death of Francisco Franco, but it was still illegal.

Honours
La Liga: 1980–81, 1981–82
Supercopa de España: 1982

See also
List of one-club men

References

External links

1950 births
Living people
People from Mondragón
Sportspeople from Gipuzkoa
Spanish footballers
Footballers from the Basque Country (autonomous community)
Association football defenders
La Liga players
Tercera División players
Real Sociedad B footballers
Real Sociedad footballers
Spain amateur international footballers
Spain international footballers
Basque Country international footballers
Basque nationalists